Tropical-Rouge! Pretty Cure is the eighteenth television anime series in Izumi Todo and Bandai's Pretty Cure franchise, produced by Asahi Broadcasting Corporation and Bandai and animated by Toei Animation. The series aired in Japan from February 28, 2021 to January 30, 2022, succeeding Healin' Good Pretty Cure in its initial time slot. The opening theme is "Viva! Spark! Tropical-Rouge! Pretty Cure" (Viva！Spark！トロピカル～ジュ！プリキュア) by Machico while the first ending theme is "Tropical I・N・G" (トロピカ I・N・G) by Chihaya Yoshitake. Starting from episode 17, "Aiming to Go My Way!!" (あこがれ Go My Way!!) by Chihaya Yoshitake and Rie Kitagawa takes over as the second ending theme.


Episode list

References

Tropical-Rouge! Pretty Cure